Radmilovići is a village in the municipality of Novo Goražde, Republika Srpska, Bosnia and Herzegovina. According to the 2013 census, the village has no inhabitants.

References

Populated places in Novo Goražde
Villages in Republika Srpska